Leah Cathrine Williamson  (born 29 March 1997) is an English professional footballer who plays for Women's Super League club Arsenal and captains the England women's national team. A versatile player, she plays in central defence or the midfield. She has spent her entire senior domestic career at Arsenal. She also represented Great Britain at the Olympics in 2021. Williamson captained England to their first UEFA European Championship victory, and the women's team's first international title, in 2022, for which she was named in the Team of the Tournament.

After being part of Arsenal's youth programme from the age of nine, Williamson debuted for the senior team as a teenager at the end of their 2014 Champions League campaign; she started for them in the League Cup final that year, in which she had individual success. With Arsenal, Williamson has won the League once and the FA Cup and League Cup twice each. She has captained Arsenal on various occasions and reached 200 appearances for them in December 2022.

Williamson represented England for all their age-group teams before making her senior debut in 2018, for 2019 FIFA Women's World Cup qualifying. She was used sparsely in her first years with England, then became a regular under manager Sarina Wiegman, who also made her permanent captain in 2022.

Early life 
Leah Cathrine Williamson was born on 29 March 1997 in Milton Keynes and grew up in Newport Pagnell on the northern edge of the urban area, attending Portfields School for primary education and Ousedale School for secondary. She comes from a divided footballing family, with her brother and father fans of North London team Tottenham Hotspur, while she, her mother and grandmother are lifelong fans of Arsenal F.C. (Spurs' main rivals). Williamson's mother played football when she was younger, cutting her hair short so that she would look like a boy and be allowed to play. In 2006, she was selected as the mascot to the Arsenal men's team in a league cup match at the Hawthorns against West Bromwich Albion, despite being on holiday, her mother, drove her the 430 mile round trip from Bude to ensure her dream was fulfilled, she was rewarded with a photo with Arsenal's Theo Walcott.

After watching long jumper Greg Rutherford, who also comes from Milton Keynes, at the 2012 Summer Olympics, Williamson briefly considered switching her focus to athletics, a sport she had local experience in, inspired to become an Olympic athlete.

Club career

Rushden & Diamonds 
Williamson joined Rushden & Diamonds Centre of Excellence at the age of 6. On that period, Williamson said, "My coach at the time left to go to Arsenal. I went across with her and had a couple of trials and luckily they took me on and I never looked back from there. So I owe it all to my coach from when I was 9."

Arsenal

Williamson joined Arsenal's Centre of Excellence in 2006 at the age of nine.

2014
Williamson made her senior team debut the day after her seventeenth birthday when she came on as an 81st-minute substitution for Rachel Yankey in Arsenal's 0–2 defeat to Birmingham City in the UEFA Women's Champions League quarter-final. She made her FA WSL debut on 16 April against Notts County. She won her first major title, the 2014 FA Women's Cup with Arsenal on 1 June in the final against Everton, in which she came on as a 76th-minute substitute for Jade Bailey. On 13 July, Williamson netted her first professional goal for Arsenal in a 4–0 win away against Millwall Lionesses in the League Cup. On 4 September, she scored her first league goal against Chelsea. She made 12 appearances in the 2014 FA Women's Super League. Williamson played in the 2014 League Cup final against Manchester City which Arsenal lost 1–0. At the end of the 2014 season, she was named the League Cup Player of the Year, ahead of Jess Clarke from Notts County, Ji So-yun from Chelsea and Toni Duggan from Manchester City.

2015

On 8 January, Williamson won the England Women's Youth Player of the Year award. Before the start of the 2015 FA Women's Super League, on 31 March, Williamson signed her first professional contract with Arsenal. On 26 April, she was named the 2014–15 PFA Young Women's Player of the Year. Williamson scored her first goal of the season in a convincing 3–0 home victory over Watford in the League Cup on 23 July. Williamson was a key figure in the club's victorious League Cup campaign, after the quarter final win over holders Manchester City, who had beaten Arsenal in the final, Williamson said, "I think Arsenal as a football club have won a lot of trophies in the past and we wanted to keep winning silverware for the club. Even with the younger players in the squad we all thought we have got to win, the morale was certainly high before the game. Last year’s final was always in the back of our mind and we know how good a side City can be. After going 1–0 up it was all about defending which we managed to do and it was a great result for us. I think we can win the cup as we have won it three times but we have to keep on focusing on the next game."

2016
Williamson helped her team reach the final of the FA Cup of 2016, which Arsenal won by a 1–0 margin over Chelsea.

2017–18

Williamson was ever-present in the 2017–18 FA WSL Cup as Arsenal ended as Champions beating the defending champions, Manchester City in the final. Arsenal's league campaign was more disappointing with Arsenal missing out a top two finish and Champions League qualification for the sixth consecutive edition of the WSL. She started the season in midfield but switched to central defence with the arrival of new manager Joe Montemurro in December 2017. On her change of position, Williamson said, "I’m not sure in the long term and I never want to shut the door on either position, because I know I can do both. But I’m enjoying playing as a centre back with the way we play. Under Joe we want to play out from the back and that suits my qualities. At the minute I am enjoying playing at centre half, but I’m open minded about what the future holds." Towards the end of the season, Williamson reflected on the season since Montemurro took over, "I feel like since Joe came in we’re back on a journey again, we had lost that a little bit. Despite today, I feel like we’re building something. But pretty much every game we have played since around November has been a must win game and that takes its toll emotionally. In every single game we have known no less than a win will do, in the league and in the cups."

2018–19
On 14 October 2018, Arsenal laid down a marker in their title challenge with a 5–0 thrashing of champions Chelsea, inflicting a first home defeat on the champions since July 2016. Joe Montemurro began utilizing Williamson on the right of a back three and after a 4–0 win at Bristol City on 28 October, in which Williamson assisted Jordan Nobbs for one of the goals, he commented positively on her performance. Arsenal won their first nine games and went into the match with Manchester City six points clear of their title rivals; however, they lost 2–0 amid an injury crisis. Two games later, on Williamson's 100th Arsenal appearance, a 2-1 defeat to Chelsea allowed Manchester City to move a point clear albeit having played one game more.

On 23 February, Arsenal attempted to defend their title in the FA WSL Continental Cup but Manchester City won 4–2 on penalties; nevertheless, Montemurro praised Williamson after the match. In the league, Arsenal won four games in a row, and after a 5–1 victory at Liverpool on 24 March, England manager Phil Neville indicated his confidence that Williamson would one day captain the national team. The team won another four games in a row to clinch the title with a 4–0 defeat of Brighton at the Falmer Stadium on 28 April. During the season, the most common passes exchanged were between Williamson and Lisa Evans at right wing back. Williamson took the most touches out of any Arsenal player, with 1,501, and completed the most passes in the opposition’s half (591). She also made thirty interceptions, more than any other player in the squad.

2020–21 
On 13 September 2020, Williamson netted her first goal of the season in Arsenal's 9–1 victory over fellow London side West Ham United.

On 18 November, Williamson made her 150th appearance in all competitions for Arsenal against Tottenham Hotspur in the Continental Cup a game which Arsenal would draw 2–2 but go on to win 5–4 on penalties.

2021–22 
On 16 June 2021, Arsenal announced that Williamson had signed a new one-year contract with the club until the end of the 2021–22 season.

Just seven months later, in January 2022, she agreed a prolonged contract with the club. Arsenal did not disclose the duration of the new commitment, but coach Jonas Eidevall stated that Leah Williamson is "a player for us to build Arsenal around".

International career

England

Youth 
Williamson has represented England since 2010 at youth levels. She captained the England under 17 side in the 2014 UEFA Women's Under-17 Championship held in England in November and December 2013, where they eventually finished fourth after being beaten by Italy in the third place play-off, losing 3–4 in the penalty shootout. She was also part of the England women's national under-20 football team to compete in the 2014 FIFA U-20 Women's World Cup in Canada in August 2014. Williamson started in the starting lineup in every England's match. The tournament, however, was a disappointment for the team as they were not able to progress through to the quarter finals, finishing third in their group with only two draws against South Korea and Mexico respectively, and a defeat to Nigeria.

On 9 April 2015, Williamson scored a penalty for her team in a qualifying match against Norway for the 2015 UEFA under-19 championship, which had been ordered to be retaken five days after the original contest. In an unprecedented decision, UEFA had ordered the match to be restarted from the 96th minute.

Previously, on 4 April, Williamson's successful penalty for England was disallowed for player encroachment (by substitute Rosella Ayane, who had won the penalty and scored a goal in her brief cameo from the bench). The laws of the game state that in such a situation, the penalty should be retaken, but the German referee, Marija Kurtes instead awarded Norway a free kick. After protests from the England camp, the European governing body agreed that the match should be replayed from the time of the incident.

The players returned to finish the last two minutes of their match after each had played what was scheduled to be their last qualifying matches for the tournament. With the scores standing at 2–1 to Norway, Williamson equalised and, in doing so, booked her team's place in the tournament finals.

Senior 
In November 2017, Williamson was called up the senior England squad. She made her debut for the senior team with six minutes left in a 2019 FIFA Women's World Cup qualifier against Russia in the team's 3–1 win.  Williamson was part of the squad who won a 2–0 victory over Denmark at Banks’s Stadium in Walsall for one of their final friendly preparation matches for the World Cup.

Williamson was involved in the England squad that won in the 2019 SheBelieves Cup in USA, playing the final game, a 3–0 win over Japan.

In May 2019, Ian Wright announced on social media that Williamson had been selected for the 2019 FIFA Women's World Cup squad. On being selected, Williamson said, "After the World Cup in Canada four years ago that’s what I set my sights on and all I’ve ever wanted to do is be a part of this team. I can’t be more thankful because I think I’m the luckiest girl in the world." Williamson made her World Cup debut from the bench in the Round of 16 match against Cameroon on 23 June 2019 in Valenciennes. Then-manager Phil Neville felt he did not use Williamson as much as he could have during the qualifiers and World Cup, putting in more experienced defenders and considering Keira Walsh crucial to the defensive midfield instead.

Williamson scored her first England goal, an 86th-minute winner, in a 3–2 friendly win against the Czech Republic on 12 November 2019.

On 17 September 2021, Williamson was named England captain for the FIFA World Cup qualifier against North Macedonia at St Mary's Stadium, Southampton. On 5 April 2022, she was appointed permanent England captain. Williamson was included, as captain, in the England squad which won the UEFA Women's Euro 2022. Williamson also showed support for LGBTQ+ rights by wearing a rainbow captain's armband throughout the Euro 2022 tournament.

On 31 July 2022, Williamson captained the Lionesses against Germany in the Euro 2022 final, winning 2–1 in extra time. The English captain made the most ball recoveries in the tournament, with 56. Williamson became the first captain in the men or women's senior teams to lead England to a European trophy, with it being 56 years since England had won a major trophy.

Great Britain 
Williamson played for the Great Britain women's Olympic football team at the Tokyo 2020 Summer Olympics (held in 2021). She was proud of her defensive work in the team's group games, and of being an Olympian, saying she had to close her eyes when the camera passed her during the anthem as she was tearing up. Williamson has said that a shift in her mentality came when GB were knocked out of the Olympics, not wanting to feel the same disappointment, "she recognised what she needed to do to fulfil her potential" in terms of the demands of international competition.

Style of play 
Williamson has been likened to Italian defender Paolo Maldini by numerous news outlets due to her ability to regain possession for her team without having to tackle her opponent. In Euro 2022, she completed the championships having recovered the ball 56 times and having completed 472 passes, in both cases doing so more than any other player in the tournament. Another article describes Williamson as the "epitome of a modern-day ball-playing centre back", citing her ability to anticipate opponent's passes and also to predict her teammates' attacking runs so that she can play a precise forward pass among her strengths. She also has by far the highest rate of passes into the final third for a defender in the WSL since 2021, with a November 2022 Arsenal technical report saying that "she wrecks the curve" for this statistic due to the margin.

In popular culture 

In Williamson's hometown, Newport Pagnell, a mural of her was completed in August 2022. The artwork was painted on a former garage by professional street artists. She was one of the legends of football featured in Nike's "The Football Verse" ad spot for the (men's) 2022 FIFA World Cup. She guest wrote about the England men's football team at this tournament for The Athletic, though told the BBC that while she will "support the boys [she has not] got any interest in it as a fan really this year, which is sad."

In 2022, she was one of the honourees of the British GQ Men of the Year Award. She appeared as a special guest on The Graham Norton Show on New Year's Eve 2022, his 30th series.

Personal life
Williamson was training to be an accountant but has reportedly put her studies on hold to focus on football. 

She is close friends with former Arsenal teammate Alex Scott, and international teammate and Barcelona midfielder Keira Walsh. Williamson and Walsh went through all the junior ranks together and received their first senior call up on the same day in 2017; in 2019, Williamson commented that whenever England teams were announced "the first thing you do, you check for your name on the list and then you check for Keira's." Walsh also reflected that there was "nobody [she] would rather have shared this journey with". 

Williamson has endometriosis, which has made her anxious to play while menstruating in the past, and has spoken about it to increase awareness of the disruptive condition and the need for more symptom-relieving measures.

Career statistics

Club
.

International
Statistics accurate as of match played 22 February 2023.

Scores and results list England's goal tally first, score column indicates score after each Williamson goal.

Honours
Arsenal
FA WSL: 2018–19
FA Women's Cup: 2013–14, 2015–16; runners-up: 2017–18, 2020–21
FA WSL Cup / FA Women's League Cup: 2015, 2017–18, 2022–23; runners-up: 2018–19, 2019–20

England

UEFA Women's Championship: 2022
SheBelieves Cup: 2019
Arnold Clark Cup: 2022, 2023

Individual
England Women's Youth Player of the Year: 2014
FA WSL Continental Cup Player of the Year: 2014
PFA Young Women's Player of the Year: 2015
FA WSL PFA Team of the Year: 2019–20, 2021–22
UEFA Women's Championship Team of the Tournament: 2022
England Women's Player of the Year: second 2021–22
IFFHS Women's World Team: 2022
FIFA FIFPRO Women's World 11: 2022
Freedom of the City of Milton Keynes (honoured 28 February 2023)
Freedom of the City of London (announced 1 August 2022)

Orders
Appointed Officer of The Most Excellent Order of the British Empire (OBE) in the 2023 New Year Honours for services to association football.

References

External links

Leah Williamson at Arsenal Ladies
Leah Williamson at The Football Association

1997 births
Living people
2019 FIFA Women's World Cup players
Arsenal W.F.C. players
England women's international footballers
England women's under-23 international footballers
English women's footballers
FA Women's National League players
Footballers at the 2020 Summer Olympics
Footballers from Buckinghamshire
Olympic footballers of Great Britain
People educated at Ousedale School
People from Milton Keynes
UEFA Women's Championship-winning players
UEFA Women's Euro 2022 players
Women's association football defenders
Women's association football midfielders
Women's Super League players
Officers of the Order of the British Empire